The big-head dragonet (Callionymus annulatus) is a species of dragonet native to the Pacific waters off of southern Indonesia where it occurs at depths of from .  This species grows to a length of  TL.

References 

A
Fish described in 1913